Michael Gonzalez-Wallace (born February 25, 1975 in Madrid) is a fitness guru best known for developing the Brain Body Fitness Program called Super Body, Super Brain.

Personal Trainer
In 2002 Gonzalez-Wallace became a Personal Trainer and created the exercise program Super Body, Super Brain a mind-body exercise program incorporating fitness with neuroscience along with a physician endorsed workout regimen. His audience reached celebrities, clients for weight loss, aging related conditions, athletic training, children, special needs children, Autism and Neurodegenerative diseases including Parkinson's and Alzheimer's.

Over the past ten years he has created workout and fitness plans for top magazines across the United States. O magazine, [MSNBC|MSNBC.com], Redbook, and Prevention magazine among others.

Background

Michael Gonzalez-Wallace has been involved with sports for more than 20 years. Michael's athletic career spans many years practicing semi-pro basketball in Spain, where his team, Estudiantes, won the Spanish National Competition (similar to NCAA in USA; he was named the MVP of the Final, May 1993). In 1995, the Spanish basketball federation certified Michael as a strength trainer and basketball coach, giving him the opportunity to develop his teaching skills. Being involved with basketball for more than 15 years, Michael learned the important concepts of teamwork, leadership, muscle coordination, and physical strength training. A graduate of the Universidad Autonoma (a top economics school in Madrid, Spain), he added the art of doing research to his skill set. In 2002, he became a personal trainer for New York Sports Club where Fitness Manager Noah Gordon gave him an opportunity to teach his skills. Shortly after he received a certification from the National Academy of Sports Medicine.

After two and a half years working in banking he quit banking in favor of new pursuits. Upon moving to USA he became immersed in Fitness and Human Performance. Michael's journey was recounted six years later by Forbes: “From Finance to Fitness”

Books and DVDs
In 2006 Michael launched The Brain Muscle Workout at a Central park event. The DVD debuted to positive reviews, including in the Chicago Tribune.

A few years later, in 2007 he claims a coffee at Starbucks changed his life:
“Sitting with some research papers in Starbucks Michael noticed a beautiful woman at the next table reading a neurology textbook. Michael started talking to her and she told him that she was a first year medical student at Columbia University showing him a book titled: “Neuroanatomy: Text and Atlas” by Neurobiologist John Martin PhD Medical Professor in Physiology and specialist in the brain and movement. She told Michael he was one of her professors, and suggested he contact him. Since then, neurobiologist John Martin PhD advises Michael on the development of a brain body fitness exercise program being part of his advisory board of Medical Professors.

John Martin, PhD, a neuroscientist at Columbia University at that time, immediately recognized the brain benefits of Gonzalez-Wallace's workouts, and advised Gonzalez-Wallace to incorporate neuroscience into his workout. He found the exercises required no coordination patterns, by challenging posture and balancing limb movement.

In 2009, Michael received an award for “Fitness Excellence" from Tim Pawlenty and Chris Coleman that recognized Super Body, Super Brain as a unique and innovative exercise program.

In 2010 he published his first book with Harper One “Super Body, Super Brain” that reached the Best Selling List in Amazon after being featured in CBS The Early Show.

School Program
In October 2008 his program was introduced to the New York City Department of Education starting with an Elementary School in the Bronx, PS 277 Michael Gonzalez-Wallace designed the individualized fitness program with the supervision of Child Psychiatrist Dr Gregory Lombardo MD, PH.D. The school fitness program incorporates intense brain activity through movements requiring balance and coordination to improve concentration and attention while performing challenging exercises. The exercises are structured to advance gradually. In January 2009 WABC-TV featured the school fitness program in their local channel.

Medical Community
Since 2010 Super Body, Super Brain increased in popularity within the medical community to aid in the treatment of Parkinson's disease. That year The Capistrant Center for Parkinson and Movement Disorders at Bethesda Hospital implemented the use of Super Body, Super Brain as part of their treatment program for Parkinson's. Other hospitals have looked to the program for their employees, while Englewood Hospital has a pilot program underway for Employees and breast cancer patients.

References

1975 births
Writers from New York (state)
Living people